Hussein Kulmiye Afrah (1920 – 1993) was Vice President of Somalia in the era of Siad Barre between 1972 and 1990. He was also a member of the Supreme Revolutionary Council.

Post Civil War 
Following the outbreak of the civil war in 1991, Kulmiye among other Hawiye Officers were not arrested nor expelled from Mogadishu.

However General Kulmiye was known for his honest straight talk against the USC militias as a clan group incapable of uniting Somalia. Kulmiye did not participate in the civil war in 1991.

See also 

Siad Barre
Muhammad Ali Samatar
Abdirizak Mohamud Abubakar
Abdullahi Yusuf Ahmed

References

1920 births
1993 deaths
Vice presidents of Somalia
Speakers of the Parliament of Somalia
Somali Revolutionary Socialist Party politicians